A cathodoluminescence (CL) microscope combines methods from electron and regular (light optical) microscopes. It is designed to study the luminescence characteristics of polished thin sections of solids irradiated by an electron beam.

Using a cathodoluminescence microscope, structures within crystals or fabrics can be made visible which cannot be seen in normal light conditions. Thus, for example, valuable information on the growth of minerals can be obtained. CL-microscopy is used in geology, mineralogy and materials science (rocks, minerals, volcanic ash, glass, ceramic, concrete, fly ash, etc.). More recently, scientists have begun to investigate its application for studying biological samples, using rare earth element-doped inorganic nanocrystals as imaging probes.  Correlative Cathodoluminescence Electron Microscopy (CCLEM) can also be performed on focus ion beam (FIB) sectioned samples, hence potentially enabling 3D CCLEM. 

CL color and intensity are dependent on the characteristics of the sample and on the working conditions of the electron gun. Here, acceleration voltage and beam current of the electron beam are of major importance. Today, two types of CL microscopes are in use. One is working with a "cold cathode" generating an electron beam by a corona discharge tube, the other one produces a beam using a "hot cathode". Cold-cathode CL microscopes are the simplest and most economical type. Unlike other electron bombardment techniques like electron microscopy, cold cathodoluminescence microscopy provides positive ions along with the electrons which neutralize surface charge buildup and eliminate the need for conductive coatings to be applied to the specimens. The "hot cathode" type generates an electron beam by an electron gun with tungsten filament. The advantage of a hot cathode is the precisely controllable high beam intensity allowing to stimulate the emission of light even on weakly luminescing materials (e.g. quartz – see picture). To prevent charging of the sample, the surface must be coated with a conductive layer of gold or carbon. This is usually done by a sputter deposition device or a carbon coater.

CL systems can also be attached to a scanning electron microscope. These devices are traditionally used for special applications like e.g. investigations in materials science, geoscience, optics research, or quality determination of ceramics. New SEM CL systems can be used for research in nanophotonics. The most prominent advantage is their higher magnifications. However, CL colour information can only be obtained by a spectroscopic analysis of the luminescence emission.

Direct viewing of emission colors is only provided by optical CL microscopes, both "cold" and "hot" cathode types.

More recently, an angle-resolved cathodoluminescence microscopy system has been developed at the FOM Institute AMOLF. This is a super-resolution technique that can create images with a resolution of up to 10 nm. As of 2011, this technology has become commercially available.

Local density of photonic states probed by CL
Beyond the material composition, cathodoluminescence microscopy can be used to structures made of known materials, but with rich combinations of these.
In this case, CL is capable of measuring the local density of states (LDOS)  of a nanostructured photonic medium, where the intensity of the emitted CL reflects directly the number of available photonic states. This is very relevant for materials like photonic crystals or complex topologies for which large LDOS variations are achieved on nanometer scales.

On the other hand, LDOS variations should be taken into account when analyzing standard CL maps.

References

Further reading

Scientists shed light on glowing materials CL probes the photonic LDOS
From the discovery of the electron to subwavelength microscopy: An introduction to cathodoluminescence DELMIC Microscopy Blog
Glowing yellow calcite and green aragonite: Cathodoluminescence sheds light in geosciences DELMIC Microscopy Blog

Microscopes
Optical microscopy techniques